I Love You So is a 1979 album by American singer Natalie Cole. Released on March 19, 1979 by Capitol Records, The album reached peak positions of number 52 on the Billboard 200 and number 11 on the Billboard R&B Albums chart.

Track listing
 "I Love You So" (Chuck Jackson, Marvin Yancy) - 4:49
 "You're So Good" (Fred Freeman, Harry Nehls) - 3:23
 "It's Been You" (Chuck Jackson, Marvin Yancy) - 4:53
 "Your Lonely Heart" (Natalie Cole, Rob Halprin) - 4:45
 "The Winner" (Chuck Jackson, Gene Barge, Marvin Yancy, Rob Halprin) - 3:40
 "Oh, Daddy" (Christine McVie) - 4:03
 "Sorry" (Chuck Jackson, Marvin Yancy, Jessy Dixon) - 4:45
 "Stand by" (Natalie Cole, Marvin Yancy) - 4:19
 "Who Will Carry On" (Natalie Cole) - 3:36

Personnel 

 Natalie Cole – lead vocals
 Reginald "Sonny" Burke – keyboards
 Mark Davis – keyboards, rhythm arrangements
 Linda Williams – keyboards 
 Marvin Yancy – keyboards
 Chuck Bynum – guitars, backing vocals (4)
 Richard Fortune – guitars 
 Johnny McGhee – guitars 
 Phil Upchurch – guitars 
 Norman Zeller – guitars 
 Stephen Dietrich – electric steel guitar
 Keni Burke – bass 
 Bobby Eaton – bass 
 Jeff Eyrich – bass
 Alvin Taylor – drums
 Teddy Sparks – drums 
 William Green – oboe, woodwinds
 Fred Jackson Jr. – woodwinds
 Ernie Watts – woodwinds
 George Bohanon – trombone, music contractor
 Maurice Spears – trombone
 Oscar Brashear – trumpet
 Bobby Bryant – trumpet
 Nolan Smith – trumpet 
 Paul Riser – horn and string arrangements
 Gene Barge – rhythm, horn and string arrangements
 Billy Page – music contractor
 McKinley Jackson – music contractor
 The Colettes – backing vocals 
 The "N" Sisters – backing vocals 
 Anita Anderson – backing vocals (7)
 Sissy Peoples – backing vocals (7)

Production 
 Kevin Hunter – executive producer, management 
 Gene Barge – producer 
 Chuck Johnson – producer
 Marvin Yancy – producer 
 Gerry Brown – engineer 
 Reginald Dozier – engineer, remix engineer 
 Zoli Osaze – engineer 
 Al Schmit – engineer 
 Gordon Shyrock – engineer 
 Frank Kejmar – orchestra engineer
 Mark Davis – remix engineer  
 Donald "Butch" Lynch – remix engineer 
 Clay McMurray – remix engineer 
 Serge Reyes – remix engineer 
 Wally Traugott – mastering at Capitol Studios (Hollywood, CA)
 John Ernsdorf – art direction, design 
 Melissa Tormé-March – art direction, cover coordinator 
 Vincent Frye – photography 
 Emory Jones – hair
 Davida – make-up

Charts

Certifications

References

1979 albums
Albums arranged by Paul Riser
Capitol Records albums
Natalie Cole albums